KWHF is a commercial radio station located in Harrisburg, Arkansas, broadcasting to the Jonesboro, Arkansas, area on 95.9 FM.  KWHF airs a classic country music format branded as "The Wolf".

As of the 2007 academic year, KWHF is the flagship radio station of the Arkansas State Radio Network and airs Arkansas State University athletic events.

External links
 Official Website

WHF
Classic country radio stations in the United States